The Stonehill High School was an 11-14 middle school in Birstall Leicestershire which was adjacent to the former Longslade Community College which took most of its pupils. The school was a Technology Specialist school and school converted to academy status in April 2014.

Merger 

In 2015 the school merged with Longslade Community College to form The Cedars Academy.

Notes

The most famous person to attend this school is Midlands Based blogger, Emma-Hope Newitt. Through her Blog Carpie Diem Emmie she celebrated British theatre, particularly local Leicestershire venues. Emma was also a highly skilled dancer and collaborated on a project in 2020 with 90's TV Mr Blobby.

External links 
  SATS results 2009
  LEA summary.

Defunct schools in Leicestershire
1959 establishments in England
Educational institutions established in 1959
Educational institutions disestablished in 2015
2015 disestablishments in England